The Ohio Department of Natural Resources (ODNR) is the Ohio state government agency charged with ensuring "a balance between wise use and protection of our natural resources for the benefit of all." ODNR regulates the oil and gas industry, the mining industry, hunting and fishing, and dams, while maintaining natural resources such as state parks, state nature preserves, state wildlife areas, state forests, and state waterways.  It was created in 1949 by the Ohio Legislature.

ODNR owns and manages more than 640,000 acres of land including 75 state parks, 23 state forests, 136 state nature preserves and 150 wildlife areas. The department has jurisdiction over more than 61,500 miles of inland rivers and streams, 451 miles of the Ohio River and 2.29 million acres of Lake Erie. ODNR is responsible for overseeing and permitting all mineral extraction, monitoring dam safety, managing water resources and mapping the state's major geologic structures and mineral resources. In addition, ODNR also oversees the registration of all of Ohio's watercraft and issues all of the state's hunting and fishing licenses. ODNR has two main focuses, regulating the use of Ohio's vast reserve of natural resources while providing visitors with the recreational opportunities that these resources provide.

Divisions
Divisions of ODNR include:
Division of Engineering - provides professional and technical engineering and related support required by ODNR to help plan, implement, and manage capital improvement programs, construction and renovation projects, and coordinate road and facility maintenance. 
Division of Forestry - operates and maintains Ohio's 23 state forests, encompassing nearly 200,000 acres. The division creates recreation opportunities for Ohioans, improves the health of Ohio's public and private forests, and protects our state from forest fires, pollution and other threats. State foresters are experts at managing Ohio's largest renewable resource. 
Division of Geological Survey - Ohio's abundant natural resources depend, in large part, on the underlying geology. The topography and chemistry of Ohio's underlying rocks and soils help dictate what plants and animals live and thrive here. The Division's mission is to provide geologic information and services needed for responsible management of Ohio's natural resources. 
Division of Mineral Resources Management - charged with regulating coal and industrial mineral mining in Ohio while also protecting the public, miners, and the environment.
Division of Natural Areas and Preserves - protects some of the best remaining examples of Ohio's rich ecological history. These diverse areas of land contain remnants of Ohio's pre-settlement past, rare and endangered species, and remarkable geologic features. Today, 136 state nature preserves and natural areas protect more than 30,000 acres. 
Division of Oil and Gas Resource Management - regulates Ohio's oil and natural gas industry by protecting Ohioans and the environment while ensuring that the state's natural resources are managed and developed responsibly. 
Division of Parks and Watercraft - the state's primary provider of outdoor recreational experiences, with 75 parks located in 59 counties. 
Division of Water Resources - management of Ohio's water resources and infrastructure through three primary programs: Dam Safety, Floodplain Management, and Water Inventory and Planning. 
Division of Wildlife - Ohio offers world-class opportunities for fishing, hunting, trapping, bird watching, wildlife viewing and other forms of fish and wildlife recreation in 150 state wildlife areas, encompassing 204,000 acres of public land. 
Office of Coastal Management - focuses on helping communities plan and implement sustainable restoration and enhancement projects that support their local economy.

See also
Department of Natural Resources (disambiguation)
List of State Fish and Wildlife Management Agencies in the U.S.

References

External links

 Ohio Department of Natural Resources
 ODNR Fishing License Online

Environment of Ohio
Natural Resources
Natural Resources
State environmental protection agencies of the United States
Natural resources agencies in the United States
1949 establishments in Ohio